The Mind's Eye is a 1993 novel by Håkan Nesser in the Van Veeteren series, translated into English in 2008 by Laurie Thompson.  Nesser was awarded the 1993 Swedish Crime Writers' Academy Prize for new authors for this novel.

A TV series based on the novel was produced in 2000, see The Mind's Eye (TV series).

References

1993 Swedish novels
Novels by Håkan Nesser